The Longest Yard is a 1974 American prison sports comedy film directed by Robert Aldrich, written by Tracy Keenan Wynn, based on a story by producer Albert S. Ruddy, and starring Burt Reynolds, Eddie Albert, Ed Lauter, and Mike Conrad. The film was released as "The Mean Machine" in the United Kingdom. The film follows a former NFL player recruiting a group of prisoners and playing football against their guards. It features many real-life football players, including Green Bay Packers legend Ray Nitschke.

The film has been remade three times: as the 2001 British film Mean Machine (a shortened version of the title used for the original's UK release), starring Vinnie Jones, the 2005 film remake, The Longest Yard featuring Adam Sandler and Reynolds as coach Nate Scarborough, and as the 2015 Egyptian film Captain Masr. In the two international remakes from 2001 and 2015, the sport was changed from gridiron football to Association Football.

Plot
Former star pro football quarterback Paul "Wrecking" Crewe walks out on his wealthy girlfriend Melissa in Palm Beach, Florida. After taking her Maserati-engined Citroën SM without permission and leading police on a car chase, Crewe is sentenced to 18 months in Citrus State Prison.

The convicts disrespect Crewe because he was dismissed from the NFL for point shaving. The warden, Rudolph Hazen, is a football fanatic who manages a semi-pro team of prison guards. He wants Crewe to help coach the team and clinch a championship. Responding to pressure from the head guard and coach, Captain Wilhelm Knauer, a reluctant Crewe eventually agrees to play in an exhibition game. Crewe forms a prison team that includes Samson, a former professional weightlifter, and Connie Shokner, a killer and martial arts expert.

Aided by the clever Caretaker, former professional player Nate Scarboro and the first black inmate willing to play, "Granny" Granville, plus long-term prisoner Pop—and the warden's amorous secretary, Miss Toot—Crewe molds a team nicknamed the "Mean Machine". He agrees to play quarterback himself. After witnessing "Granny" being harassed by some of the prison guards without breaking, the black inmates decide to volunteer their services and join the team. Unger, one of the prison trustees, persistently asks Crewe if he can replace Caretaker as manager of the team, which Crewe refuses to do. In retaliation, Unger attempts to kill Crewe by fashioning a homemade bomb from a light bulb filled with a combustible fluid, designed to detonate inside Crewe's cell when he turns on the light. Caretaker is killed instead when he enters Crewe's cell to retrieve some papers; Unger locks the cell door, preventing rescue. Hazen sternly lectures Crewe's teammates about the consequences of any attempted escape after the game. Afterward, Crewe re-energizes the team with a surprise - presenting them with professional uniforms (stolen from the guards by Caretaker before he was killed). They charge onto the field in their new uniforms, angering the guards and Hazen.

The "Mean Machine" starts out well, and at halftime the game is close: the guards lead 15-13. Hazen threatens Crewe as an accessory to Caretaker's murder unless Crewe loses the game to the guards by at least 21 points. Crewe reluctantly agrees, but only if Hazen promises not to hurt the other prisoners; Hazen agrees, but in bad faith, and tells Knauer to have his team "inflict as much physical punishment on the prisoners as humanly possible" as soon as they are ahead by 21 points. Crewe makes deliberate mistakes, putting the "Mean Machine" down by more than three touchdowns, 35-13, then takes himself out of the game. The guards gladly injure several of the prisoners, and Crewe's teammates feel betrayed.

Depressed, Crewe goes back into the game, but the prisoners refuse to cooperate with him until he convinces them of his change of heart. The "Mean Machine" gets back into the game, trailing 35-30, one of their touchdowns scored by Nate despite his bad knee, and he is immediately cut down and crippled by guard Bogdanski. As he is wheeled off the field, Nate tells Crewe to "screw Hazen" and win the game. Crewe scores the winning touchdown with no time left and the "Mean Machine" wins, 36-35.

As the prisoners celebrate, Crewe walks across the field towards the departing crowds. Hazen repeatedly orders Knauer to shoot him because he thinks Crewe is trying to escape. Knauer hesitates due to his newfound respect for Crewe, who is actually retrieving a football. Disgusted at what he almost did, Knauer hands the rifle back to Hazen saying, "Game ball." Crewe returns to the crestfallen Hazen with the ball telling him, "Stick this in your trophy case." Crewe walks into the stadium tunnel with Pop who says "I knew you could do it!"

Cast

Production

Writing
Producer Albert S. Ruddy wrote the story in the late 1960s. He got Tracy Keenan Wynn, who had written a TV movie about life in prison, The Glass House (1972), to write a script. Wynn signed in June 1972. Finance was raised through Paramount, who released Ruddy's The Godfather. Aldrich says he took the third act of the film from Body and Soul (1947) a film on which Aldrich had worked as assistant director. He says this consisted of his character falling from grace and trying to redeem himself.  He later did this on All the Marbles (1981).

Though the film was billed as being based on an original story, some reviewers found parallels between this film and the 1962 Hungarian film Two Half Times in Hell, which was based on a real-life association football game in 1942 between German soldiers and Ukrainian prisoners of war during World War II, known as the Death Match.

Casting
A number of the actors had previously played professional football. Henry played for the Pittsburgh Steelers and the Los Angeles Rams. Kapp played quarterback for the Minnesota Vikings and in the Canadian Football League (1959-1966). Nitschke was a middle linebacker for the Green Bay Packers who was inducted into the Pro Football Hall of Fame in 1978, four years after release, and Atkins played for the Los Angeles Rams, the Washington Redskins and the Oakland Raiders. Also appearing as prisoners are Wheelwright, who played with the New York Giants, Atlanta Falcons and the New Orleans Saints, and Ogden, who played with the St. Louis Cardinals, the New Orleans Saints, the Atlanta Falcons and the Chicago Bears. Sixkiller was a collegiate star as a quarterback for the University of Washington Huskies from 1970-1972, and briefly played pro in the defunct World Football League. Reynolds himself had played college football for Florida State University before injuries curtailed his career. There were a number of convicts used as players during filming.

Filming
The film was shot on location at Georgia State Prison in Reidsville, Georgia. The production had the cooperation of then-Governor Jimmy Carter. Filming had to be delayed from time to time due to prison uprisings. There is now a museum that can be visited by appointment about the film and capital punishment in Georgia located in the prison's former Death Row.

According to Reynolds, Aldrich knew comedy was "not his strong suit" so they would do a take as written then he would ask for a "schtick take" where Reynolds could "clown around". Reynolds said the completed film used the schtick scenes about "65% of the time".

Of Reynolds, Aldrich said "on occasion he's a much better actor than he's given credit for. Not always: sometimes he acts like a caricature of himself. I thought he was very good in Longest Yard."

Release
The Longest Yard opened in New York on August 21, 1974. This was followed by a release in Los Angeles on September 25, 1974 followed by a general release in October 1974.

The film earned $22 million in North American theatrical rentals. It had admissions in France of 200,738.

Reception
The film holds a 77% rating on Rotten Tomatoes based on 35 reviews. The critical consensus reads: "Equal parts tough and funny, and led by a perfectly cast Burt Reynolds, The Longest Yard has an interesting political subtext and an excellent climax – even if it takes too long to get there."

Nora Sayre of The New York Times called the film "a terrible picture" with prison guards that "behave like leering sci-fi monsters" and Reynolds doing a "lumbering imitation" of Marlon Brando in On the Waterfront. Arthur D. Murphy of Variety declared it "an outstanding action drama, combining the brutish excitement of football competition with the brutalities of contemporary prison life. Burt Reynolds again asserts his genuine star power, here as a former football pro forced to field a team under blackmail of warden Eddie Albert." Pauline Kael of The New Yorker wrote that Reynolds was "perfect in this brutal comic fantasy about a football game between crazily ruthless convicts and crazily ruthless guards; for all its bone-crunching collisions, the picture is almost irresistibly good-natured and funny." Gene Siskel of the Chicago Tribune gave the film three stars out of four and wrote that director Robert Aldrich "is effective in portraying black inmates as a world apart in the prison system; it's the one realistic element in this old-fashioned and brutal drama." Charles Champlin of the Los Angeles Times stated, "The story is both clever and unsubtle, the action riot-gun fast from start to satisfying finish, the characters vivid and boldly drawn, the jokes set up and paid off with old-pro efficiency: the bone-snapping, billy-club violence (of which there is inevitably a fair amount) is by Aldrich's standards restrained and by any standards allowable." Tom Shales of The Washington Post wrote, "It might seem morally imperative at this point to condemn with indignation what this movie is trying to do—stir up gut-level reactions at a mob-baiting level. And yet, however one may feel about that goal, it would be hard to deny that the movie achieves it."

MAD satirized this movie as "The Longest Yardbird" in issue #176 (July '75).

Awards and nominations

Remakes
The film has been remade three times:
 Mean Machine (2001 film), starring Vinnie Jones, taking place in England and changing the sport from American football to Association football.
 The Longest Yard (2005), starring Adam Sandler as Crewe and featuring Burt Reynolds in a supporting role (that of retired player Nate Scarborough).
 Captain Masr, which translates to Egypt's Captain (2015 film), starring Mohamed Iman, taking place in Egypt and again changing the sport to Association football.

See also
 List of American films of 1974

References

External links

 
 
 

1974 films
1970s sports comedy-drama films
American football films
American sports comedy-drama films
1970s English-language films
Films scored by Frank De Vol
Films directed by Robert Aldrich
Best Musical or Comedy Picture Golden Globe winners
Films shot in South Carolina
Films shot in Savannah, Georgia
1970s prison films
Paramount Pictures films
1974 comedy films
1974 drama films
1970s American films